Larry Linwell Rowe is an American politician, historian, and author. He is a Democratic member of the West Virginia House of Delegates from the 36th district.

Early life
Rowe was born to parents Rosa Rowe and Eldridge E. Rowe, Sr in Bluefield, West Virginia, US. While attending West Virginia University, he was the elected a Member of their Sphinx Senior Men's Honorary Society after being placed on the dean's list for five semesters and maintaining a 3.65 grade point average. Rowe was also a member of the Debate team, Debate Society, and served as a member of the student cabinet. Rowe is a member of the Episcopal faith.

Career
Upon graduating from West Virginia University, Rowe began working as a Senior Law Clerk for Kenneth Keller Hall in the United States Circuit Court from 1978 until 1979. Following this, he was the Board Chair for the Legal Aid Society of Charleston and volunteered for Manna Meal. While working as an attorney, he also began writing about the local history of West Virginia resulting in his book Virginia Slavery and King Salt in Booker T. Washington’s Boyhood Home. From 1996 until 1998, Rowe was elected a member of the West Virginia House of Delegates from the 36th district and spent four years as a member of the West Virginia Senate.

References

Living people
Democratic Party members of the West Virginia House of Delegates
21st-century American politicians
American historians
Year of birth missing (living people)